Pablo Horacio Guiñazú (born 26 August 1978) is an Argentine football manager and former player.

A hard-working defensive midfielder, Guiñazú played for a number of clubs in Argentina, Italy, Russia, Paraguay and Brazil, and represented the Argentina national team in 2003, being called up again for the second leg of the 2011 Superclásico de las Américas.

Career
Guiñazu started his professional career with Newell's Old Boys in 1996. He played over 100 games for the club before joining Italian side Perugia. He returned to Argentina in 2001 to play for Independiente, where he was part of the Apertura 2002 championship team.

In 2003, he returned to Newell's Old Boys before joining Russian team Saturn. After one season in Russia he returned to South America to play for Libertad in Paraguay. He was part of the team that won the Paraguayan Primera División in 2006.

In 2007 Guiñazu joined Internacional in Brazil. On 4 January 2013, he terminated his contract with Internacional for private reasons, and returned to Libertad.

He returned to Argentina in 2016 after signing for Talleres de Córdoba. After more than six years without scoring a goal, Guiñazú scored the goal that gave Talleres promotion to Argentine Primera División after a 12-year absence.

On 1 March 2019, Guiñazú announced his retirement after Talleres failed to qualify to Copa Libertadores group stage.

Career statistics

International

International appearances and goals

Honours

Club
Independiente
Torneo Apertura: 2002

Libertad
Paraguayan Primera División: 2006

Internacional
Campeonato Gaúcho: 2008, 2009, 2011, 2012
Copa Sudamericana: 2008
Suruga Bank Championship: 2009
Copa Libertadores: 2010
Recopa Sudamericana: 2011

Vasco da Gama
Campeonato Carioca: 2015

Individual
 Campeonato Brasileiro Série A Team of the Year: 2009

References

External links
 
 

1978 births
Living people
Sportspeople from Córdoba Province, Argentina
Association football midfielders
Argentine footballers
Argentina international footballers
Newell's Old Boys footballers
A.C. Perugia Calcio players
Club Atlético Independiente footballers
Sport Club Internacional players
FC Saturn Ramenskoye players
Club Libertad footballers
CR Vasco da Gama players
Talleres de Córdoba footballers
Argentine Primera División players
Serie A players
Russian Premier League players
Campeonato Brasileiro Série A players
Argentine expatriate footballers
Expatriate footballers in Paraguay
Expatriate footballers in Italy
Expatriate footballers in Russia
Expatriate footballers in Brazil
Argentine expatriate sportspeople in Paraguay
Argentine expatriate sportspeople in Brazil
Argentine expatriate sportspeople in Italy
Argentine expatriate sportspeople in Russia
Argentine football managers
Atlético Tucumán managers
Club Sol de América managers
Expatriate football managers in Paraguay